Pearson Language Tests is a unit of the Pearson PLC group, dedicated to assessing and validating the English language usage of non-native English speakers. The tests include the Pearson Test of English Academic (PTE Academic), the PTE General (formerly known as London Tests of English), and PTE Young Learners. These are scenario-based exams, accredited by the QCA and Ofqual, and are administered in association with Edexcel, the world's largest academic examining body.

In 2009, Pearson Language Tests created the Pearson Test of English Academic (Ref.) under endorsement from the Graduate Management Admission Council (GMAC), the organization responsible for the GMAT. The test is scored under CEFR guidelines, and is administered through the Pearson Virtual User Environment.

Upon release, it was recognized by nearly 6,000 organizations. For instance, the test is approved for use by the Australia  Border Agency and the Australian Department of Immigration and Citizenship for visa applications. PTE-A is also acceptable for the United Kingdom and New Zealand visa applications. The test is predominantly read by a computer rather than a human grader to reduce waiting times of the results for students.

Pearson Test of English Academic 
The Pearson Test of English Academic is an English language test designed to assess the readiness of non-native English speakers to participate in a university-level English language instruction program.  Pearson created PTE Academic in response to demand from institutions, government and other organizations for a more accurate way of testing non-native English language students who enter the English-speaking academia world.

PTE Academic is endorsed by the Graduate Management Admission Council. Amongst other universities, London Business School in the UK, Harvard Business School, Stanford Graduate School of Business, and Yale University in the United States accept PTE Academic scores. Other institutions in other countries, including Spain, France, and China, have also signed up to accept PTE Academic. These include leading business schools such as INSEAD and HEC Paris in France, IESE, IE Business School and ESADE in Spain and SDA Bocconi in Italy. In addition to the business schools, there are also a number of arts and music colleges who accept the exam's scores. In February 2013, opened a new test center in Petaling Jaya, Malaysia in association with the Malaysian British Educational Cooperation Services.

It is a computer-based exam which focuses on real-life English used in academic surroundings.  This is to say that integrated language is used throughout the test and students will listen to a variety of accents and academic language which they will encounter at English-speaking higher education institutions.

The exam will include an unmarked voice recording of the candidate, which is part of advanced biometric data that should assist institutions in verifying the identity of candidates and should aid them with their admission decisions. The test will be a maximum of 2 hours and 15 minutes long and takers can expect their results to be delivered to them, online, within 5 working days.

Test scores are reported on the Global Scale of English, a standardized, numeric scale from 10 to 90 which can measure English language proficiency more precisely with reference to the widely known set of levels distinguished in the Common European Framework of Reference for Languages, or CEFR.

Structure 
The Pearson Test of English Academic comprises 3 sections: i) Speaking & Writing ii) Reading and iii) Listening.

Here is the detailed paper pattern:

PTE General 
PTE General (formerly known as the London Test of English) or Pearson English International Certificate (as of December 2020) is an international English language examination for speakers of English as a foreign language (EFL). It is developed by Pearson Language Tests and administered by Edexcel, the exams are accredited by QCA, the Qualification and Curriculum Authority. In some countries (e.g. Poland, Greece) the oral interview is assessed by locally trained assessors, whereas in other countries (e.g. France, Italy, Argentina) they are entirely graded in London.

Pearson English International Certificate is consistent with a theme-based exam designed to test how well a learner can communicate in authentic and realistic situations, and not on how well they remember formal vocabulary and structures. For this reason, the tests use real-life scenarios rather than pedantic grammatical exercises. They test the four skills: reading, writing, listening and speaking.  There are six levels which are mapped to the Common European Framework of Reference for Languages. The Framework was developed by the Council of Europe to enable language learners, teachers, universities or potential employers to compare and relate language qualifications by level.

Reading, writing, listening and speaking are tested at all levels.  The alignment of the London Tests of English to the CEFR has been established by mapping the test specifications to the CEFR descriptors. This mapping process was submitted to an external audit by University of Westminster. Work is in progress to further improve the robustness of the alignment on the basis of empirical data. Levels 4 and 5 of the PTE General are accepted for entrance to universities in the UK and by a variety of international companies.

Pearson Tests of English have been formally accredited by the Qualifications and Curriculum Authority (QCA).

History

PTE General were originally developed by the University of London Schools Examination Board in 1982. The Examination Board merged with Business & Technological Council (BTEC) in 1996 to become Edexcel, the largest examining body of academic and vocational in the UK.

Schema Theory

PTE General were one of the first set of ESOL exams to apply the Notional-Functional Syllabus and Schema Theory to language testing. Schema Theory was developed by psychologists such as R.C.Anderson and Frederic Bartlett. Schemata (plural of schema) are learned models suggesting relationships between objects and help structure future learning.

PTE General tasks are related through a common theme which allows candidates to activate the different domains of knowledge they have acquired and thus further enhance second language acquisition. It also provides a coherent thread for candidates to guide them through the various tasks.

The tasks can be interrelated through a common topic or a scenario where the different tasks “build” a story and integrate different language skills.

PTE Young Learner test 

PTE Young Learners (formerly known as LTEfC) are international English language exams for young children (aged from 7 to 12) who are learning English as a foreign language (EFL). They test the four skills: reading, writing, listening and speaking.

PTE Young Learners exams are based around the amusing  adventures of the Brown family. The exams are theme based and designed to be fun and motivating. At the lower levels they aim to test how well children can use language structures and at the higher levels how well they can use language to complete communicative tasks. For this reason, the tests use real-life scenarios rather than grammatical exercises.

There are four PTE Young Learners levels

History

The PTE Young Learners were originally developed by the University of London Schools Examination Board in 1982. The Examination Board merged with Business & Technological Council (BTEC) in 1996 to become Edexcel.

Theory of Schema

PTE Young Learners and PTE General are based on a scenario, which accords with Schema Theory. This means that all exam tasks are related through a common theme which allows candidates to activate the different domains of knowledge they have acquired and thus further enhance second language acquisition. It also provides a coherent thread for candidates to guide them through the various tasks. The tasks can be interrelated through a common topic or a scenario where the different tasks "build" a story and integrate different language skills.

Technology

Pearson has developed an online marking system, ePEN, and a web-based test centre service system, Edexcel Online, to provide rapid feedback on the individual performance of students in the exams.

References

External links 
 Pearson Language Tests
 PTE Academic
 EALTA Guidelines

English language tests
Pearson plc

es:Pearson Language Tests
pl:Pearson Language Tests